Pseudlepista flavicosta is a moth in the subfamily Arctiinae. It was described by George Hampson in 1910. It is found in the Democratic Republic of the Congo and Sierra Leone.

References

Moths described in 1910
Lithosiini